The 2018–19 season was Al-Faisaly's 9th consecutive season in Pro League, the top flight of Saudi Arabian football, and their 65th year in existence. Along with the Pro League, the club competed in the King Cup.

The season covers the period from 1 July 2018 to 30 June 2019.

Players

Squad information

Transfers

In

Loans in

Out

Loans out

Pre-season friendlies

Competitions

Overall

Last Updated: 16 May 2019

Pro League

League table

Results summary

Results by round

Matches
All times are local, AST (UTC+3).

King Cup

All times are local, AST (UTC+3).

Statistics

Squad statistics
Last updated on 16 May 2019.

|-
! colspan=14 style=background:#dcdcdc; text-align:center|Goalkeepers

|-
! colspan=14 style=background:#dcdcdc; text-align:center|Defenders

|-
! colspan=14 style=background:#dcdcdc; text-align:center|Midfielders

|-
! colspan=14 style=background:#dcdcdc; text-align:center|Forwards

|-
! colspan=14 style=background:#dcdcdc; text-align:center| Players sent out on loan this season

|-
! colspan=14 style=background:#dcdcdc; text-align:center| Player who made an appearance this season but have left the club

|}

Goalscorers

Last Updated: 16 May 2019

Assists

Last Updated: 20 April 2019

Clean sheets

Last Updated: 14 March 2019

References

Al-Faisaly FC seasons
Faisaly